NBA Jam 2000 is a sports Nintendo 64 game developed by Acclaim Studios Salt Lake City as licensed basketball simulation for the 1999–2000 NBA season. It also contained elements of the classic NBA Jam series in Jam Mode. The rosters were accurate as of October 16, 1999. All photos and video used are from the 1998–1999 NBA season. It was announced on June 16, 1999. The cover features former Sacramento Kings power forward Chris Webber. The game also features Kevin Harlan on play-by-play with Marv Albert as the studio host. The Utah Jazz' Dan Roberts provides the arena announcing.

Reception

The game received "average" reviews according to the review aggregation website GameRankings.

See also
List of NBA video games

References

External links

1999 video games
2000
Nintendo 64 games
Nintendo 64-only games
Acclaim Entertainment games
Video games developed in the United States